Hans Conrad Escher von der Linth (born 24 August 1767 in Zürich; died 9 March 1823) was a Swiss scientist, artist, and politician. He headed the "Great Council of Switzerland" in 1798, a period of French occupation. He also published a survey of the Swiss Alps and is perhaps most significant for his work in the project to "tame" the Linth river. His son was geologist Arnold Escher von der Linth.

References

External links 
 

18th-century Swiss scientists
Swiss artists
1767 births
1823 deaths
Escher von der Linth